Drillia audax is a species of sea snail, a marine gastropod mollusk in the family Drilliidae.

Description
The length of the shell attains 9.25 mm, its diameter 2.5 mm.

A little whitish species of oblong fusiform shape and of bold contour. It is very distinct in both sculpture and painting of the spiral straw-coloured lirae surrounding the 7 whorls, which are not costulate. One spiral lira, acute and prominent, is especially noticeable at the base of each whorl, just above the sutures. The aperture is ovate-oblong with a distinctive wide sinus. The siphonal canal is wide and very short.

Distribution
This species occurs in the demersal zone of the Gulf of Oman, found at a depth of 284 m.

References

 M.M. Schepman, Full text of "Siboga expeditie" 
 Tucker, J.K. 2004 Catalog of recent and fossil turrids (Mollusca: Gastropoda). Zootaxa 682:1–1295

External links

audax
Gastropods described in 1903